Ras ( compare with Arabic Rais or Hebrew Rosh), is a royal title in the Ethiopian Semitic languages.  It is one of the powerful non-imperial titles.

Historian Harold G. Marcus equates the Ras title to a duke; others have compared it to "prince".  

The combined title of Leul Ras (Amharic: ልዑል ራስ) was given to the heads of the cadet branches of the Imperial dynasty, such as the Princes of Gojjam, Tigray, Ras Tafari Makonnen and the Selalle sub-branch of the last reigning Shewan Branch, and meaning "Lord of Lords", the highest title of lord.

Historic Ras

 Ras Wolde Selassie (1736 - 1816)
 Ras Sabagadis Woldu (1780 – 1831)
 Ras Alula (1827 – 1897)
Ras Gobana Dacche (1821 – 1889)
Ras Mekonnen Wolde Mikael (1852-1906)
 Ras Mengesha Yohannes (1868-1906)
 Ras Araya Selassie Yohannes (1869/70-10 June 1888)
 Ras Sebhat Aregawi (1892-1914)
 Ras Gugsa Welle
 Ras Gugsa Araya Selassie 
 Ras Kassa Haile Darge (1881 – 1956)
 Ras Tafari (the latter emperor Haile Selassie, 1892 – 1975)
 Ras Darge Sahle Selassie (1830 – 23 March 1900)
 Ras Abebe Aregai (1903– 1960)
 Ras Wubneh Tessema (1943-1974)

See also 

 Ethiopian aristocratic and court titles
 Negus

References

Ethiopian nobility
Noble titles